Lynn Voorlas (born September 24, 1955), known professionally as Lane Brody, is an American country music singer-songwriter, active since the early 1980s, best known for her 1984 Billboard-topping country hit "The Yellow Rose" (a duet with country music singer Johnny Lee), and for the Oscar-nominated song "Over You" from the 1983 film Tender Mercies. Besides "The Yellow Rose", Brody has eleven other chart singles on the Billboard country charts.

Biography
Brody was born Lynne Connie (Eleni Constantina) Voorlas on September 24, 1955, in Oak Park, Illinois, but calls Racine, Wisconsin her hometown.  She graduated from Horlick High School in 1969. She started her music career by singing commercial jingles for many popular TV and radio commercials. In 1982, she co-wrote Anne Murray's song "The Hottest Night of the Year" with fellow songwriters Thomas Campbell and Kerry Chatter. Soon afterward, she began charting her own singles, including the No. 15 country hit "Over You", which was featured in the film Tender Mercies and received a nomination for Best Original Song at 56th Academy Awards in 1984. Brody and Johnny Lee wrote lyrics to and recorded the theme music for the 1983–1984 NBC television show, The Yellow Rose. The theme song of the same name became a No. 1 hit on the U.S. country singles chart on April 21, 1984.

In 1984, Brody was the voice of the XIV Olympics singing for Beatrice foods. During that year Brody also signed with GRT Records. Brody made her singular appearance on the PBS music television program Austin City Limits, where she sang duets with Thom Bresh, with whom she had been on tour through 1987. Lane has appeared on numerous shows such as NBC Today Show, Crook And Chase, and she has appeared in the show Taxi.

Lane was inducted to the Country Music Hall of Fame's Walkway of Stars in 1996.

Her song "All The Unsung Heroes" is the theme behind a documentary on the Vietnam War Memorial documentary. Brody is married to Nashville musician Eddie Bayers.

Discography

Albums

Singles

Guest singles

Music videos

References

External links 

1955 births
American country singer-songwriters
American women country singers
Country musicians from Illinois
Liberty Records artists
Living people
Singer-songwriters from Illinois
William Horlick High School alumni
21st-century American women